Nagarjuna Nagar Halt railway station is an Indian Railways station near Acharya Nagarjuna University in Andhra Pradesh. It lies on the Guntur–Krishna Canal section and is administered under Guntur railway division of South Central Railway zone.

History
The southern part of the West Coast State Railway (from Waltair to Vijayawada) was taken over by Madras Railway in 1901.

Jurisdiction 
It lies on the Howrah–Chennai main line, Delhi–Chennai line and is administered under Guntur railway division of South Central Railway zone. The station is also a part of Guntur–Krishna Canal section.

See also 
 List of railway stations in India

References

Railway stations in Guntur district
Railway stations in Guntur railway division